Exohedral fullerenes, also called exofullerenes, are fullerenes that have additional atoms, ions, or clusters attached their outer spheres, such as C50Cl10  and C60H8. or fullerene ligands.

See also
Fullerene ligands
Endohedral fullerene

References

Fullerenes
Supramolecular chemistry